Finnieston railway station was located in Glasgow, Scotland and served the Finnieston area of that city. On the Glasgow City and District Railway it was located on the modern North Clyde line close to where it emerges from west end of Finnieston Tunnel from Charing Cross near Argyle Street and Finnieston Street.

In June 2018, it was revealed that the local community council was considering reopening the station. In September 2021, when asked by Labour MSP Paul Sweeney, Transport Minister Graeme Dey said the reopening was considered within the Strategic Transport Projects Review 2 but no commitment for reopening had been made yet.

References

Notes

Sources 
 
 
 
 Picture at RCAHMS

Disused railway stations in Glasgow
Railway stations in Great Britain opened in 1886
Railway stations in Great Britain closed in 1917
Former North British Railway stations